David Agry (August 2, 1794 – January 30, 1877) was an American lawyer, jurist, and legislator. He served as a member of the Wisconsin Territorial House of Representatives and the Wisconsin State Assembly.

Biography
Agry, who practiced law, was born in Pittston, Maine, the son of John Agry and Elizabeeth (Reed) Agry. He graduated from Dartmouth College, studied law in Maine and was admitted to the Maine State Bar Association. A practitioner of law, he practiced law in Bangor, Maine, before moving to Louisiana to practice law. He then moved to New York City where he practiced law and was in business while practicing law. In 1840, Agry moved to Brown County, Wisconsin Territory where he practiced law.

Political career
In 1842 and 1843, he served in the Wisconsin Territorial House of Representatives, representing Winnebago County, Wisconsin. He was in the first Wisconsin Constitutional Convention of 1846. In 1848, Agry served in the 1st Wisconsin Legislature as a Democratic member of the State Assembly. He was elected Wisconsin Circuit Court Judge for Brown County in 1850, serving until his death on January 30, 1877, in Green Bay, Wisconsin.

References

1794 births
1877 deaths
People from Pittston, Maine
Politicians from Green Bay, Wisconsin
Politicians from Bangor, Maine
Dartmouth College alumni missing graduation year
Maine lawyers
Louisiana lawyers
New York (state) lawyers
Wisconsin lawyers
Wisconsin state court judges
Members of the Wisconsin Territorial Legislature
19th-century American politicians
19th-century American judges
19th-century American lawyers
Democratic Party members of the Wisconsin State Assembly
Dartmouth College alumni